Tom, Dick and Harry is a placeholder phrase for multiple unspecified people.

It could also refer to:

 Tom, Dick and Harry Mountain, Oregon, U.S.
 Tom, Dick and Harry (novel), an 1894 novel by Talbot Baines Reed 
 Tom, Dick and Harry (1941 film), an American comedy
 Tom, Dick or Harry (song), from the 1948 musical Kiss Me, Kate
 Tom, Dick, and Harry (2006 film), a Bollywood comedy

See also 
 Tom, Dick and Harriet, a 1980s British sitcom
 Tom, Dick and Sally, a UK comic strip
 Tom, Dick, and Mary, a 1960s American sitcom in the 90 Bristol Court programming block